Bünyamin Sudaş (born August 23, 1975), aka Bünyami Sudaş, is a Turkish weightlifter competing in the 105 kg division.

He is a member of ASKI Sport Club in Ankara, where he is coached by Raif Özel and Muharrem Süleymanoğlu.

Early life
Bünyamin Sudaş was born on August 23, 1975, in Ekmekli village of Erzincan Province to Hacı Kadir Sudaş. After finishing the high school, he attended Gazi University in Ankara to study physical education and sports.

Achievements
Olympics

World Championships

European Championships

Mediterranean Games

Legend:
 MR Mediterranean Games Record

References

External links
 Bünyamin Sudaş at Weightlifting Database

1975 births
People from Erzincan
Living people
Turkish male weightlifters
Weightlifters at the 2000 Summer Olympics
Weightlifters at the 2008 Summer Olympics
Olympic weightlifters of Turkey
Mediterranean Games gold medalists for Turkey
Mediterranean Games silver medalists for Turkey
Competitors at the 1997 Mediterranean Games
Competitors at the 2005 Mediterranean Games
Competitors at the 2009 Mediterranean Games
Mediterranean Games medalists in weightlifting
European Weightlifting Championships medalists
World Weightlifting Championships medalists
20th-century Turkish people
21st-century Turkish people